Evan Jones may refer to:

Politicians
Evan O. Jones (1830–1915), Wisconsin politician
Evan John Jones (politician) (1872–1952), American Republican politician
Sir Evan Davies Jones, 1st Baronet (1859–1949), Welsh civil engineer and politician
Evan Rowland Jones (1840–1920),  Welsh politician, MP for Carmarthen Boroughs

Poets
Evan Jones (Australian poet) (1931–2022), Australian poet and professor
Evan Jones (Canadian poet) (born 1973), Canadian poet and critic

Sportspeople
Evan Jones (cricketer) (born 1996), South African cricketer
Evan Jones (footballer) (1888–?), Welsh international footballer
Evan Jones (swimmer) (born 2004), Scottish swimmer
Evan Jones (Canadian football) from 1978 CFL Draft

Others
Evan Benjamin Gareth Jones (born 1937), British mycologist
Evan Jones (pirate) (fl. 1698–1699), pirate captain active near Madagascar and the African coast
Evan Jones (missionary) (1820–1872), Baptist missionary to the Cherokees and leader of one group on the Trail of Tears
Evan John Jones (witch) (1936–2003), English occultist
Evan Jones (Stitch Media), Canadian interactive producer 
Evan Jones (Farmers Alliance) (1846–1899), President of the Texas Farmers Alliance
Evan Jones (Blue Heelers), fictional character from the Australian TV series Blue Heelers
Evan Jones (writer) (born 1927), Anglo-Caribbean writer
E. D. Jones (1903–1987), Librarian of the National Library of Wales in Aberystwyth, 1958–1969
Evan Jones (actor) (born 1976), American actor
Evan Jones (Ieuan Gwynedd) (1820–1852), Welsh campaigner and journalist
Evan Jones (Gurnos), see 1871 in Wales
Evan Jones (Calvinistic Methodist), see Henry Edwards (priest)
Evan Jones (Ifan y Gorlan), harpist, died in 1859 in Wales
Evan Jones (author) for Rivers of America Series
Evan Jones (rapper), American rapper from Miami, Florida
Evan Jones (musician), Australian musician